Lert may refer to:

Lert (surname)
Lerd, Ardabil